Gabriel Soto Díaz (born April 17, 1975) is a Mexican actor and model. He won the national male pageant El Modelo Mexico, and placed first runner-up in Mister World 1996. He was also a member of the former Mexican boy band Kairo, and acts in telenovelas.

Biography 
Gabriel Soto attended Edron Academy.

Career
He began modeling at age 18 after participating in the Mister World contest in 1996 in Istanbul, Turkey, and becoming the first runner-up. 
In 1997, Gabriel joined the band Kairo replacing Eduardo Verástegui. The albums he participated were Libres and Pasiones.

He has participated in several soap operas in which he managed to convince the public and the critics with his performance. 
Mi querida Isabel was the first soap opera in which Gabriel acted, followed by Alma Rebelde, Mi destino eres tú, and Carita de ángel  leading his most important role, playing Ulises "ugly" in the soap opera Amigas y rivales produced by Emilio Larrosa.

In 2002, Soto appeared in the soap opera Las vías del amor with Aracely Arambula and Jorge Salinas which was produced by Emilio Larrosa.

In 2004, he was cast in the soap opera Mujer de Madera, produced by Emilio Larrosa, starring in one of the main roles alongside Edith Gonzalez, who would later be replaced by Ana Patricia Rojo. In this telenovela he also worked with Jaime Camil and Maria Sorte.

In 2005, following his return from Los Angeles where he took courses in acting for film, boxing classes, and surf, Soto competed in the Mexican version of Dancing with the Stars.

Then, in 2006, he starred in the telenovela La Verdad Oculta produced by Emilio Larrosa, next to Galilea Montijo Alejandra Barros and Eduardo Yanez, who after being away for many years from telenovelas returned to join the cast.

In 2007, Gabriel starred in the soap opera Bajo las riendas del amor, an adaptation of Cuando llega el amor.

In 2008, he joined the Lucero Suárez. produced Querida Enemiga as a protagonist alongside Ana Layevska, Jorge Aravena and María Rubio.

In 2009, he participated in Sortilegio, produced by Carla Estrada, in which he played Fernando Alanis, before touring the United States with the  play Sortilegio, el show.

In 2011, he appeared in La Fuerza del Destino, produced by Rosy Ocampo, as Camilo Galvan, one of the protagonists. The telenovela also starred David Zepeda, Sandra Echeverria, Laisha Wilkins and Juan Ferrara.

In 2012, he starred in Un Refugio para el Amor with Zuria Vega, playing the role of Rodrigo Torreslanda.

In 2013, he starred as the protagonist (alongside Gloria Trevi) in Emilio Larrosa's telenovela: Libre para amarte.

His last starring role was as Maximiliano Bustamante in the universally acclaimed telenovela Yo no creo en los hombres where he also garnered critical appraisal.

Filmography

Television

Awards and nominations

References

External links 
 Gabriel's personal web page http://www.gabrielsoto13.com
 
 Net Glimse Bio
 Kairo's Bio at Yahoo! Music

1975 births
Living people
Male beauty pageant winners
Mexican male film actors
Mexican male models
Mexican male telenovela actors
Male actors from Mexico City
20th-century Mexican male actors
21st-century Mexican male actors
Mexican expatriates in the United States